New York City Water Tunnel No. 3 is a water-supply tunnel forming part of the New York City water supply system. It is being built by the New York City Department of Environmental Protection (NYCDEP) to provide New York City with a third connection to its upstate water supply. The tunnel will serve as a backup to Water Tunnel No. 1, completed in 1917, and Water Tunnel No. 2, completed in 1936.

Water Tunnel No. 3 is the largest capital construction project in New York City history. Construction began in 1970. Portions of the tunnel were placed into service in 1998 and 2013 and the remaining sections are expected to be complete by 2032.

Stages

One 
The project was authorized in 1954 and imagined as "the greatest nondefense construction project in the history of Western Civilization". The city determined that it needed a third water tunnel so that Tunnels 1 and 2 could be closed for inspection and repairs. Stage One construction of Tunnel 3 began in 1970 and completed in 1993. This portion was put into service in 1998 and cost about $1 billion.

This first section was bored through bedrock between  underground, using drilling and blasting techniques. From there it runs under the East River and Roosevelt Island into Astoria, Queens.

Two
Stage Two was built using tunnel boring machines and comprises two sections. The Brooklyn and Queens section runs  and begins in Red Hook, Brooklyn, where it connects to the Richmond Tunnel for Staten Island. It passes through Park Slope, Bedford-Stuyvesant, and Bushwick before reaching Maspeth, Queens. From Maspeth it runs through Woodside and Astoria, where it connects to the end of the Stage One section.

It begins at a valve chamber in Central Park, runs south along the west side of Manhattan, and curves around the southern end of the island to come partway through the Lower East Side. A spur of the Manhattan tunnel begins on the west side at approximately 34th Street, goes to the east side and then turns north under Second Avenue to about 59th Street. The tunnel itself was completed in 2008, and after the construction of seven riser shafts was completed, this section of the tunnel opened in 2013.

Three
What used to be called Stage Three is now being referred to as a separate project, the "Kensico–City Tunnel".  It will be  in diameter, running from the Kensico Reservoir in Westchester to the Van Cortlandt Valve Chamber complex in the Bronx.

Four
Stage Four is a proposed tunnel that would start at the Hillview Reservoir, pass through the eastern Bronx and then through Queens, where it would eventually meet the Stage Two section.

Valve chambers
The largest valve chamber is in Van Cortlandt Park. It controls the flow of water from the city's Catskill and Delaware systems. These systems provide 90 percent of the city's current drinking water. The complex has nine vertical shafts; and two manifolds.

Additional, though smaller, valve chambers are in use under Central Park at 79th Street, under Roosevelt Island, and in Jackson Heights.

Deaths
Since 1970, when construction on the tunnel began, twenty-four people have died in construction-related accidents. The deaths have included twenty-three workers and a 12-year-old boy, Don-re Carroll, who died while exploring uncapped water pipes in the Bronx. No deaths have occurred since 1997.

Construction progress
In 2002, New York City mayor Michael Bloomberg made completion of the tunnel a priority, and set a goal date of 2021. Commissioner Christopher O. Ward helped move this project along for the Mayor. A New York Times report in 2016 stated that mayor Bill de Blasio was postponing completion of the project indefinitely, but he subsequently stated that this was a miscommunication between his press office and the Times, and that the completion date was actually being pushed up to 2020.

In September 2022 NYCDEP Commissioner Rohit Aggarwala stated that following the construction of the two deep riser shafts in Brooklyn and Queens, the Tunnel No. 3 project will be completed in 2032.

In popular culture
 Scenes from the 1995 film Die Hard with a Vengeance were filmed in Tunnel No. 3.
 Payback, a 1997 novel by Thomas Kelly, includes "the twenty-three men who have died building New York City Water Tunnel Number Three" among those to whom it is dedicated. Billy Adare, one of the principal characters, is a sandhog working on the tunnel whose father was killed in the early stages of its construction. Payback was re-released in 2008 with the new title Sandhogs.
 The CSI: NY episode "A Man a Mile" deals with the death of a sandhog during construction of Water Tunnel No. 3.
 In Spider Robinson's novel Night of Power, Tunnel No. 3 is depicted as an abandoned project, taken over as the secret headquarters for a revolutionary movement.
 In Linda Fairstein's 2007 novel Bad Blood, Tunnel No. 3 deals with the interconnection between a homicide case and the sandhogs working in Tunnel No. 3 and other NYC tunnels for generations.
 The Nova episode "The Hidden City" (October 3, 1989) included a segment on the construction of the tunnel.
 Scenes of the final episode of season 4 of The Strain were filmed in Tunnel No. 3.
 In Emily St. John Mandel’s 2010 novel The Singer’s Gun, Anton Walker is head of a small research division at an international water systems consulting firm. He was tasked with creating recommendations for providing NYC residents with drinking water in the event of catastrophic failure of Tunnel No. 1 or 2 before the completion of Tunnel No.  3.

References

External links 
 John H. Betts The Minerals of New York City originally published in Rocks & Minerals magazine, Volume 84, No. 3, pp. 204–252 (2009).

Water infrastructure of New York City
Tunnels in New York City
Water tunnels in the United States